

Lavinia State Reserve, formerly Lavinia Nature Reserve, is a 68 km2 protected area on King Island, lying at the western end of Bass Strait and belonging to the Australian state of Tasmania.

Description

The state reserve occupies much of the coast at the north-eastern end of the island, extending from Lake Martha Lavinia and Penny’s Lagoon in the north to the estuary of the Sea Elephant River in the south. It contains swamps, long sandy beaches and coastal heathlands, protecting the largest remaining block of native vegetation on King Island.

History
Reservation of land in what is now the state reserve began in 1959 with the gazettal of the 510 ha Sea Elephant River Wildlife Sanctuary; it was incorporated with additional land to the north in 1971 with the proclamation of the Lavinia Sanctuary.  In 1978, land consisting of the Lavinia Nature Reserve and the Sea Elephant Wildlife Sanctuary  was listed in the now-defunct Register of the National Estate.    In 1983 a 1730 ha area around the Sea Elephant estuary was listed as a wetland of international importance under the Ramsar Convention, being only the fifth Australian site to be so designated. In 1994 the Ramsar site boundary was realigned and extended to correspond with those of the current nature reserve.
In 2001, land previously reserved under the name Lavinia Nature Reserve and some associated "reserved land in the class of nature reserve under section 21(1) of the Regional Forest Agreement (Land Classification) Act 1998" was declared as the Lavinia State Reserve.

The name derives from the 52-ton schooner Martha Lavinia, wrecked on a reef offshore in 1871 near what is the site of the state reserve while carrying a cargo of potatoes from Tasmania to Adelaide, which gave its name to several features along the north-eastern King Island coast.

Flora and fauna

Flora
The state reserve contains three heathland communities: swamp paperbark dry heath, coastal tea tree heath and scented paperbark wet heath. : The vulnerable scrambling ground fern is present. In the past frequent fuel-reduction burning has led to much woody vegetation being replaced by bracken and tussock grassland. Saltmarsh abuts the Sea Elephant estuary.

Fauna
The state reserve provides habitat for many birds and other animals, including the critically endangered orange-bellied parrot, the extremely rare King Island subspecies of the brown thornbill, and the Southern Hairy Red Snail. Short-tailed shearwaters have colonies in the dunes behind Lavinia Beach while fairy terns nest on the sand spit at the mouth of the Sea Elephant River. Hooded plovers and pied oystercatchers nest on the beaches. The marshy grassland surrounding the estuary is home to the only known Tasmanian population of the golden-headed cisticola.

See also
Protected areas of Tasmania
List of Ramsar sites in Australia

References

External links
Webpage on the Protected Planet website

State reserves of Tasmania
King Island (Tasmania)
1971 establishments in Australia
Protected areas established in 1971
Tasmanian places listed on the defunct Register of the National Estate
Ramsar sites in Australia